Aphrodesia's Diary is a 1983 American adult erotic film directed by Radley Metzger (as "Henry Paris", uncredited) and Gérard Kikoïne (as "Gerard Kikoine").

The film was released  during the Golden Age of Porn (inaugurated by the 1969 release of Andy Warhol Blue Movie) in the United States, at a time of "porno chic", in which adult erotic films were just beginning to be widely released, publicly discussed by celebrities (like Johnny Carson and Bob Hope) and taken seriously by film critics (like Roger Ebert).

Premise
Adrianne is reading her diary in her hotel room, and begins to recall some of the adventures that she wrote in it, including her experiences with a young horse trainer, a man who offered her a lot of money to appear in an erotic film, the gambler who persuaded her to be a liberated woman, and more.

Cast

 Dominique Saint Claire as Adrianne (as Arlene Manhatten)
 Kevin James as Jeff
 Lisa Cintrice as Susie
 Joanna Storm as Mrs. Triad
 Vanessa del Rio as Therapist
 Morgane as Alice (as Marianne Flowers)
 Desiree Cousteau as Cassandra - The Erotic Spirit

Notes
According to one film reviewer, Radley Metzger's films, including those made during the Golden Age of Porn (1969–1984), are noted for their "lavish design, witty screenplays, and a penchant for the unusual camera angle". Another reviewer noted that his films were "highly artistic — and often cerebral ... and often featured gorgeous cinematography". Film and audio works by Metzger have been added to the permanent collection of the Museum of Modern Art (MoMA) in New York City.

See also

 Andy Warhol filmography
 Erotic art
 Erotic films in the United States
 Erotic photography
 List of American films of 1983
 Sex in film
 Unsimulated sex

References

Further reading
 
 Heffernan, Kevin, "A social poetics of pornography", Quarterly Review of Film and Video, Volume 15, Issue 3, December 1994, pp. 77–83. .
 Lehman, Peter, Pornography: film and culture, Rutgers depth of field series, Rutgers University Press, 2006, .
 Williams, Linda, Hard core: power, pleasure, and the "frenzy of the visible", University of California Press, 1999, .

External links
 .
 

American erotic films
Films directed by Radley Metzger
1983 films
1980s pornographic films
1980s English-language films
1980s American films